The Special Reserve was established on 1 April 1908 with the function of maintaining a reservoir of manpower for the British Army and training replacement drafts in times of war. Its formation was part of the military reforms implemented by Richard Haldane, the Secretary of State for War, which also created the Territorial Force. Haldane originally intended that the Militia would provide the reserve, but opposition from its representatives forced him to abolish it and create the Special Reserve instead. Only 60 per cent of the Militia transferred into the new reserve, and it was consistently under strength, particularly in officers. Reservists enlisted for a six-year term of service, and had to undergo six months of basic training on recruitment and three to four weeks training annually. The Special Reserve was organised into battalions, providing a third for each of the regular army's 64 two-battalion infantry regiments and a fifth and sixth for the five four-battalion infantry regiments. In addition to providing replacements to the regular army, the Special Reserve was deployed on home defence duties guarding the coast and key installations during the First World War. The routine nature of its duties meant that scant attention was paid to it in regimental histories. After the war, the Special Reserve was abolished and the Militia was resurrected in 1921 to take on its former role. No effort was made to restart recruitment, and in 1924 the new Militia's functions were absorbed into the Supplementary Reserve.

Background
Traditional mistrust of a standing army resulted in a strong tradition of part-time military institutions in England and later the United Kingdom. The oldest of these, the English Militia, traced its origins to the military obligations of the Anglo-Saxon period, and its formal existence can be dated back to the first militia statutes of 1558. Originally recruited by various means of compulsion, the British Militia had become a voluntary institution by the late 19th century, and over 950,000 men had served in its ranks between 1882 and 1904. The Militia was, alongside the Yeomanry and the Volunteer Force, designed to supplement the regular army in defending the country against invasion and insurrection, and the three auxiliary institutions were not liable for service overseas. They were poorly organised, with inadequate equipment and training, and operated as discrete institutions integrated neither with each other nor the regular army.

To make the small, professional British Army better able to cope with the increasing commitments of defending the empire, a series of reforms were begun by Edward Cardwell in 1871 and completed by Hugh Childers in 1881. They were designed to foster the integration of auxiliary and professional by linking militia and volunteer battalions with regular army regiments, and provide the means by which army battalions abroad could be reinforced by linked battalions at home. As an example, the Gloucestershire Regiment was formed in 1881 by the amalgamation of the 28th (North Gloucestershire) and 61st (South Gloucestershire) Regiments of Foot, which became the new regiment's 1st and 2nd Battalions respectively. The county's two militia battalions, the Royal South Gloucestershire Militia and the Royal North Gloucestershire Militia, became the regiment's 3rd and 4th (Militia) Battalions, and the 1st (City of Bristol) Gloucestershire Rifle Volunteers and the 2nd Gloucestershire Rifle Volunteers became the regiment's 1st and 2nd Volunteer Battalions. The reforms effectively ended the Militia's existence as an independent body capable of operating in independent units, and it became little more than a source of recruitment into the army, with 35 per cent of its men enlisting each year.

The reorganisation did little to ease the army's manpower problems, and as early as 1879, during the Anglo-Zulu War, there were just 59 regular home battalions supporting 82 abroad. The situation became untenable at the turn of the century when, during the Second Boer War, the strain placed on the army severely denuded Britain's home defences and forced the government to appeal for volunteers to augment the regular forces overseas. Nearly 46,000 militiamen served in South Africa, another 74,000 were enlisted into the army, and five battalions were deployed as garrison troops on Malta, St. Helena and in Egypt. Some 20,000 men of the Volunteer Force were transferred voluntarily into the army reserve and sent to South Africa, and the yeomanry provided the nucleus of the separate Imperial Yeomanry in which over 34,000 volunteered.

Formation
The experience in South Africa prompted further debate about the abilities of the army to intervene in a major foreign conflict and of the auxiliaries, which were perceived to have performed poorly during the war, to support it. The reform efforts of the conservative Secretaries of State for War, William St John Brodrick and H. O. Arnold-Forster, foundered in the face of opposition from auxiliary interests in the government, but their successor, the liberal Richard Haldane fared better with his efforts. He improved the army's capability to fight in a major foreign conflict by creating a six-division Expeditionary Force, and the auxiliary forces were re-organised into the better trained, equipped and integrated Territorial Force. His reforms did not, however, escape vested interests unscathed, and he was forced to make some fundamental compromises before he could be sure of successfully passing the Territorial and Reserve Forces Act 1907 in Parliament. His plan to assign 31,000 of the Militia to the Expeditionary Force, allocate a further 56,000 as a reserve for it and transfer the remainder into the Territorial Force was met with opposition by militia representatives. Their intransigence forced Haldane to abolish the Militia altogether and create the Special Reserve as a separate institution to the Territorial Force, both of which were established on 1 April 1908.

The infantry of the Special Reserve were integrated into the regular army's regimental system. Each of the 69 infantry regiments received a 3rd (Reserve) battalion (or, for regiments with four battalions, a 5th and 6th (Reserve) Battalion), and 23 regiments also established between them an additional 27 (Extra Reserve) battalions. The reserve battalions were to be 550 strong, increasing to 1,500 on mobilisation with the arrival of Army Reservists not immediately required by the Expeditionary Force. The reserve was given the dual role of providing replacement drafts to the regiment's regular battalions and supplementing the Territorial Force in home defence. It was also Haldane's intention that the Extra Reserve battalions would be available for garrison duties in the Mediterranean or line of communications duties in support of the Expeditionary Force, and ambiguous statements he made later suggested that Special Reserve battalions might also serve overseas. Reservists were volunteers at least 17 years old who committed to a six-year term of service, six months full time basic training on enlistment and three to four weeks training annually. Officers were recruited from a newly created Special Reserve of Officers, though Haldane also hoped that another of his innovations, the university-based Officers' Training Corps (OTC), would be a source of reserve officers. They were required to undergo twelve months of basic training, later reduced to six, and then attend an annual camp and other training schemes as required.

In addition, three Imperial Yeomanry regiments (the North Irish Horse, South Irish Horse and King Edward's Horse (The King's Overseas Dominions Regiment)) created after the Boer War could not be incorporated into the Territorial Forces because the Act did not cover Ireland or the Dominions. These were transferred to the Special Reserve. It had been intended to convert the Royal Garrison Artillery Militia units into Royal Field Artillery brigades of the Special Reserve, but this was abandoned and the units disbanded in 1909. Instead the Special Reserve artillerymen would form Brigade Ammunition Columns for the Regular RFA brigades on the outbreak of war.

Some 35,000 former militiamen, representing about 60 per cent of the Militia, transferred into the Special Reserve. A further 20,000 new recruits were enlisted, though 6,100 of them joined the army before completing their initial six months' training and some 2,000 were quickly rejected on medical grounds. Many that did pass the medical were nevertheless in poor shape physically. The reserve failed to attract sufficient recruits, and it was consistently 16–18 per cent short of its 80,300 establishment. Because of the long training requirement, those it did attract tended to be the unemployed and the young, in many cases too young, with boys as young as 15 being accepted. The problem was particularly acute in the officer corps; only 283 of the 18,000 men who had by 1912 graduated from the OTC had joined, leaving the Special Reserve some 50 per cent short in subalterns. In 1910, Haldane established the Veteran Reserve, renamed later to National Reserve. It was recruited from former pre-Territorial Force auxiliaries, time-expired territorials and ex-regular soldiers. Faced with a shortfall in the Special Reserve of 13,000 in 1914, Haldane's successor, John Seely, identified the similar number of National Reservists who had agreed to be liable for service overseas as the means of bringing it up to establishment.

First World War

On the outbreak of the First World War on 4 August 1914, units of the Special Reserve proceeded to their war stations. For example, the day after war was declared, the 3rd Battalion, Border Regiment, normally based in the north of England, occupied positions defending the Thames and Medway at Shoeburyness, east of London; on 8 August, the 3rd Battalion, Gloucestershire Regiment, normally based in the west of England, was guarding the Royal Arsenal at Woolwich in London; and the 3rd Battalion, Essex Regiment, took up defence duties closer to home at Harwich on the Essex coast. Simultaneously, the Special Reserve battalions began managing not only the flow of their own reservists and their regiments' re-activated Army Reservists, but also assisted with the second intake of Kitchener's New Army, which altogether increased battalion strengths to 2,000 men. Drafts began to be sent to the regular battalions; the 3rd Essex Battalion, for example, had already sent 300 men to the regiment's 2nd Battalion. The huge increase in numbers led to over-crowded depots, and the 3rd Battalion, Duke of Cornwall's Light Infantry, was so overwhelmed that it had to send many men on to other regimental depots. Special Reserve units experienced a high turnover of men in bringing their regular battalions up to strength and, once battle had been joined in France, replacing casualties. At one stage in 1914, consideration was given to reinforcing the Central Force, the mobile element of Britain's home defence force, with three Special Reserve divisions, but the idea was quickly dropped because of the transient population of the Special Reserve battalions at any given time.

On the outbreak of war the three regiments of Special Reserve Horse were broken up to provide divisional cavalry squadrons for infantry divisions on the Western Front. They formed reserve regiments to supply their own drafts. Similarly, the Special Reserve artillery manned the ammunition columns, but there were no subsequent replacements for this pool of men.

By September 1914, the Special Reserve had provided 35,000 replacements and was becoming so short of trained men that its ability to perform its defence functions was in doubt. The problem was exacerbated by the loss of many of its instructors to the New Army. In the first year of the war, the 3rd Battalion, Queen's Own Cameron Highlanders, supplied over 3,800 officers and men in drafts to its regular battalions, and similar efforts were made by almost every reserve battalion. Field Marshal Sir John French, Commander-in-Chief, Home Forces, acknowledged the great difficulties the Special Reserve faced in "performing the double duty of training drafts...and defending our shores". In 1915, Special Reserve units began assisting in the training of Volunteer Training Corps battalions; the Suffolk Volunteers, for example, received training from the instructors of the 3rd Battalion, Suffolk Regiment, and the Huddersfield Volunteers were attached to the Special Reserve battalion of the Seaforth Highlanders. The introduction of conscription early in 1916 overwhelmed the New Army's regiment-based system of training new recruits, resulting in the reorganisation of its training battalions into the centralised Training Reserve in September 1916. The Special Reserve battalions remained responsible for training replacements for their own regular battalions, but when they were at full establishment, new recruits were sent to the Training Reserve.

In 1916, after conscription had been introduced a number of Special Reserve battalions (all 'Extra Reserve') were selected for service on the Western Front. These battalions saw considerable action:
 7th (Extra Reserve) Battalion, Royal Fusiliers
 4th (Extra Reserve) Battalion, King's (Liverpool Regiment)
 4th (Extra Reserve) Battalion, Bedfordshire Regiment
 4th (Extra Reserve) Battalion, South Staffordshire Regiment
 4th (Extra Reserve) Battalion, North Staffordshire Regiment

The few casualties among Special Reservist units at home were a result of air raids – the 3rd Battalion, Manchester Regiment, lost 31 men during a Zeppelin raid on Cleethorpes in April 1916, and the 3rd Battalion, Suffolk Regiment, suffered a number of fatalities in an air raid at Felixstowe in July 1917 – and most losses were due to sickness or training accidents.

Postwar
After the war, the Special Reserve was only some 9,000 strong, and a committee chaired by General Alexander Hamilton-Gordon concluded in July 1919 that it should be abolished. By the end of the year it had effectively ceased to exist. The routine nature of its wartime duties meant that it received little attention in most post-war regimental histories. When the Territorial Force was reconstituted as the Territorial Army in 1921, the Special Reserve was also renamed, becoming the Militia. Its units retained the same role, acting as regiments' third battalions in the provision of a reserve for the regular battalions, but no effort was made to recruit into it, other than in Northern Ireland where they provided the only auxiliary force. Militia battalions existed on paper until they were disbanded in April 1953. In 1924 the Special Reserve/Militia's function was absorbed by the Supplementary Reserve, which was tasked with providing the regular army with specialist technical support in times of crisis.

References

Bibliography
 
 
 
 
 Brig-Gen Sir James E. Edmonds, History of the Great War: Military Operations, France and Belgium, 1914, Vol I, 3rd Edn, London: Macmillan,1933/Woking: Shearer, 1986, ISBN 0-946998-01-9.
 J.B.M. Frederick, Lineage Book of British Land Forces 1660–1978, Vol I, Wakefield: Microform Academic, 1984, ISBN 1-85117-007-3.
 
 Brig E.A. James, British Regiments 1914–18, London: Samson Books, 1978/Uckfield: Naval & Military Press, 2001, ISBN 978-1-84342-197-9.
 Norman E.H. Litchfield, The Militia Artillery 1852–1909 (Their Lineage, Uniforms and Badges), Nottingham: Sherwood Press, 1987, ISBN 0-9508205-1-2.
 
 
 

 
Military units and formations established in 1908
Reserve forces of the United Kingdom